Adi Himelbloy (or Himmelbleu, ; born ) is an Israeli actress, model, and television host.

Early life
Himelbloy was born in Holon, Israel, to Israeli-born parents. Her father Yigal Himelbloy was of Ashkenazi Jewish (USSR-Jewish) descent, whereas her mother Dolly ( Amon) is of Sephardic Jewish (Turkish-Jewish and Iranian-Jewish) descent. Himelbloy was first discovered on the Dudu Topaz's primetime entertainment show HaRishon BaBidur on Israel's Channel 2, when she won a modeling contest held as part of the show.

She was enlisted as a soldier to the Israel Defense Forces.

Career
After the show, she worked in modeling for several years, until being approved as an actress for the Israeli television series HaShminiya ("The Octette"), in which she played the character Natasha Segovia, a young woman with an unusual talent for drawing. In 2006, Himelbloy participated in the Israeli drama series HaAlufa ("The Champion"). Afterwards Himelbloy participated in the children's song contest Festigal 2006, where she performed along with other actors from HaShminiya such as Dawn Lanny-Gabay and Shira Vilensky. In addition, she also started appearing in TV advertisements. In 2007 she participated in Festigal once more and dubbed the character of April O'Neill in the Hebrew version of the animated film Teenage Mutant Ninja Turtles.

In 2009, Himelbloy participated in the Israeli musical Treasure Island (I HaMatmon). She also played in the Israeli drama series The Double (HaKfula). On June 29, 2008, Himelbloy became a hostess at the Israeli Children's Channel. In November 2008, the Israeli sci-fi series Deus debuted on the Israeli Children's Channel, in which Himelbloy played the character Rona Merom. During the late 2000s, Himelbloy also modeled for the Israeli swimwear company Pilpel.

In 2009, Himelbloy participated in the Festigal for the third time and in 2010, she hosted a talk and game show called Chuba's Angels, alongside the actress Dawn Lanny-Gabay.

In 2010, she participated in the Israeli version of Dances with Stars, coming in third place.

Personal life
She married Israeli restaurateur Nadav Peled in 2014. They have two sons.

Filmography
 HaShminiya (2005–2007, 2013–2014)
 HaAlufa (2006–2007, 2009)
 Deus (2008–2011)
 Malabi Express (2013)

References

External links

 

1984 births
Israeli Sephardi Jews
Israeli female models
Israeli television actresses
Israeli television presenters
Living people
Reality modeling competition participants
Israeli people of Turkish-Jewish descent
Israeli people of Iranian-Jewish descent
Israeli women television presenters
Israeli Ashkenazi Jews
Israeli Mizrahi Jews
Israeli Jews